The Moldovans in Russia consists of two major parts: Russian citizens and labor migrants (gastarbeiters).

According to the 2002 Russian Census there were 172,196 Moldovans among the legal residents of Russia.

According to the 2010 Russian Census there were 156,400 Moldovans, as well as 3,201 Romanians. According to the U.S. Census Bureau, 544 ethnic Romanians born in Russia lived in the United States in 2015.

The head of the diaspora is Alexandr Kalinin the leader of the Party of Regions of Moldova. In Russia, he heads the Congress of Moldovan Diasporas (Конгресс Молдавских Диаспор) established in 2009.

According to the 2014 estimate of the Russian Federal Migration Service, there were over 550,000 nationals of Moldova  in Russia, with estimated 228,000 illegal residents. In 2013, about 33,500 work permits were issued to Moldovan citizens.

At the end of 2018 Presidents of Russia and Moldova declared a migration law amnesty for Moldovan citizens who would return to Moldova between January 1 and 23, 2019. Alexandr Kalinin commented that this move looked like an attempt to boost the election performance of the then Moldovan President Igor Dodon.

Notable Moldavians and Moldovans in Russia

Historical
Nikolai Spathari (1636-1708) Russian diplomat from Moldavia
Dimitrie Cantemir (1673 - 1723), Moldavian and Russian politician and scientist
Antiochus Kantemir (1708-1744), son of Dimitrie, Russia's ambassador to Great Britain and France 
Maria Cantemir (1700-1754), daughter of Dimitire, Princess of Moldavia, a lady in waiting and salonist, and a mistress of Peter the Great, the Emperor of Russia
 (1737-1814), Russian hisrorian and publisher
 Mikhail Kheraskov (1733-1807), poet and playwright 
Russian Noble Prize winner Élie Metchnikoff was a descendant of a Moldavian nobleman (a grandson of Nikolai Spathari) who came to Russia with exiled Dimitrie Kantemir
 Nikolay Gredeskul (1865-1941), Russian liberal politician
 Nikolay Florea (1912-1941), Soviet anstronomer
 Pyotr Kapitsa (1894-1984), Soviet physicist, engineer and Nobel laureate

Modern era
Ion Druță (born 1928), writer, holds Russian and Moldovan citizenship
Emil Loteanu (1936-2003), film director; holds Russian, Moldovan and Romanian citizenships
Eugen Doga (born 1937), composer; holds Russian and Moldovan  citizenships
Andrey Gaydulyan (born 1984), actor; holds Russian and Moldovan citizenships
Wincenty (Morari) (born 1953), bishop of the Russian Orthodox Church; holds Russian and Moldovan citizenships
Dmitry Bivol (born 1990), boxer (Moldovan father)

See also
Romanians in Russia

Notes

References

Russia
Demographics of Russia